Holstein is a German and Danish surname, often used with the nobiliary particle "von", meaning "of", and may refer to:

 Anna Morris Holstein (1824-1901), American organizational founder, civil war nurse, author
 Barry Holstein (born 1943), American physicist
 Betty Holstein, Australian tennis player
 Friedrich von Holstein (1837-1909), German statesman
 Hedwig of Holstein (1260–1324), a Swedish queen
 Isaac Holstein (born 1987), Filipino-American basketball player
 Mechtild of Holstein (1220 or 1225–1288), a Danish queen consort
 Theodore Holstein (1915-1985), American theoretical physicist

See also
 Staël von Holstein

Surnames
German-language surnames
Danish-language surnames